David Bronson (February 8, 1800 – November 20, 1863) was a United States representative from Maine. Born in Suffield, Connecticut, he graduated from Dartmouth College in 1819. He studied law, was admitted to the bar in 1823 and commenced practice in North Anson, Maine.

He was elected a member of the Maine House of Representatives, and was elected as a Whig to the Twenty-seventh Congress to fill the vacancy caused by the resignation of George Evans. He served from May 31, 1841, to March 3, 1843.  He moved to Augusta and resumed the practice of law. Bronson was elected a member of the Maine State Senate in 1846.

He moved to Bath and served as collector of customs.  He was judge of probate for Sagadahoc County. He was an unsuccessful candidate for election in 1856 to the Thirty-fifth Congress. Bronson died in St. Michaels, Maryland.

References

1800 births
1863 deaths
Dartmouth College alumni
People from Suffield, Connecticut
People from Bath, Maine
Politicians from Augusta, Maine
People from St. Michaels, Maryland
People from Anson, Maine
Maine lawyers
Whig Party members of the United States House of Representatives from Maine
19th-century American politicians
19th-century American lawyers